Ghammas or Al Ghammas is a town in Al-Shamiya District, Al-Qādisiyyah Governorate, Iraq. It is located on the Al-Shamiya branch of the Euphrates river, approximately 22 km south of district capital Al-Shamiya.

Notes 

Populated places in Al-Qādisiyyah Governorate.